Samuel George Bogere Egesa is an Anglican bishop in Uganda: since 2013 he has been the Bishop of Bukedi.

Egesa was born in Izira village, Nakavule parish, Kapyanga sub-county in Bugiri District. He was educated at Nanfugaki Primary School, Jinja Secondary School and Uganda Christian University. He was ordained in 1997 and served in Iganga. Egesa's last post before becoming a bishop was Diocesan Secretary to Michael Kyomya, the Bishop of Busoga.

References

21st-century Anglican bishops in Uganda
Uganda Christian University alumni
Anglican bishops of Bukedi
Living people
People from Bugiri District
Year of birth missing (living people)